Sharon Riis (1947 - May 20, 2016) was a Canadian novelist, short story writer and screenwriter.

She was nominated for the Books in Canada First Novel Award in 1976 for her debut novel The True Story of Ida Johnson, published by Women's Press. Her second novel, Midnight Twilight Tourist Zone, was published in 1989 by Douglas & McIntyre. Riis also published short stories in various Canadian literary magazines.

She won the Genie Award for Best Adapted Screenplay at the 23rd Genie Awards for Savage Messiah. She was also nominated for Best Original Screenplay at the 4th Genie Awards for Latitude 55°, which she cowrote with John Juliani, and at the 8th Genie Awards for Loyalties, which she cowrote with Anne Wheeler.

In addition, she was a writer and story editor for the television series Bliss and Wapos Bay: The Series, and wrote the television films Change of Heart and The Wake.

Riis died on May 20, 2016.

References

External links

1947 births
2016 deaths
Canadian women novelists
20th-century Canadian screenwriters
Canadian television writers
20th-century Canadian novelists
20th-century Canadian women writers
Best Screenplay Genie and Canadian Screen Award winners
Writers from Alberta
21st-century Canadian women writers
Canadian women screenwriters
Canadian women television writers
Canadian women short story writers
20th-century Canadian short story writers
21st-century Canadian short story writers
21st-century Canadian screenwriters